Hallucination Generation is a 1967 film by Edward Mann.  Purportedly intended as a warning against the dangers of pill-popping Sixties hedonism along the lines of 1936's Reefer Madness, the film's primary purpose appears to have been titillation, thus landing it in the genre of exploitation cinema.

The film is a drama set in Spain where a small group of American young adults is living. The leader of the group is a drug dealer. The others are there living carefree lives as beatniks. The leader has more nefarious aims in mind, and uses drugs to lure the others into lives of crime.  Most of the film is in black and white, but there is a psychedelic sequence depicting the purported effects of the group using LSD which was filmed in color.

It is often cited as an example of counterculture cinema.

George Montgomery is the psychedelic advisor to a circle of young expatriates living on the Isle of Ibiza. Visitor Danny Stone, who avoids taking part in the fun until his mother cuts off his allowance, seeks help in a monastery after an LSD-induced crime spree results in the murder of a Barcelona antiques dealer. The real world is black-and-white, the LSD trips are in color. Featuring Renate Kasché, Tom Baker, Marianne Kanter, and Steve Rowland. Filmed in Spain.

In popular culture
The film inspired a 1989 song, "Hallucination Generation" by the new beat band The Gruesome Twosome.

See also
 Hippie exploitation films

References

Further reading
 Psychotronic Encyclopedia of Film, Michael Weldon, Ballantine 1983, pp. 302

External links
 
 

1967 films
American documentary films
1960s exploitation films
Films about hallucinogens
Lysergic acid diethylamide
1960s educational films
Psychedelic films
1960s English-language films
1960s American films
American educational films